Quadrigeminal brachium may refer to:

 Inferior colliculus, also known by the Latin term inferior quadrigeminal brachium
 Superior colliculus, also known by the Latin term superior quadrigeminal brachium